Elliott Johnson (born 1975) is an American artist and designer.  He was born in Irving, Texas and earned a BFA in painting and drawing from the University of North Texas (Denton, Texas) in 2001.  He lives and works in Dallas, Texas.

His paintings are known for their rococo flourishes and tendrils combined with vague text in cartoon-like bubbles. Totally, Tenderly, Tragically from 2007, in the collection of the Honolulu Museum of Art, demonstrates this juxtaposition.

External links
 The artist's website

Footnotes

1975 births
Living people
Modern painters
American designers